Lanaken is a municipality located in the Belgian province of Limburg. On January 1, 2007, the municipality of Lanaken had a total population of 24,724. Its area is 59.00 km² which gives a population density of 415 inhabitants per km².

Lanaken is located on the Belgian-Dutch border, bordering Maastricht directly. In the 2006 census, some 20 percent of the inhabitants turned out to have the Dutch nationality. A number of neighbourhoods in Lanaken is characterized by these immigrants' numerous villas and exclusive landhouses.

Lanaken consists of the following villages: Lanaken proper, Rekem, Neerharen, Gellik, Veldwezelt, Smeermaas and Kesselt. Also located in Lanaken are the hamlets Briegden and Herbricht and the old village centre Oud-Rekem.

The South African pulp and paper company Sappi operates a large mill on the outskirts of the town.
In 2006, four 100 meter high wind turbines were built to provide electricity to the Celanese factory. Later on 8 more have been built.

The reactivation of the former railway Maastricht-Lanaken-Hasselt was scheduled in 2014 but no such project has started to this day.
 
The Veldwezelt-Hezerwater Palaeolithic archaeological site is located in the municipality.

Born in Lanaken
 Eric Gerets (1954) Former professional football (soccer) player for Belgium, born in Rekem
 Edgar Willems (1890–1978), artist, musician, and music educator

Gallery

References

External links
 
Official website - Available only in Dutch